Havelock North High School is a state co-education secondary school located in Havelock North, New Zealand.

HNHS has a head boy and head girl chosen by the Form 7 (Year 13) students at the start of the year as well as the secretary. HNHS is split into four houses which compete against each other during the year in events such as a swimming sports, an athletics event and house choir.

Havelock North High School 1XI Girls Cricket Team were the national secondary school girls cricket team title holder in 2008. HNHS also hosted the national orienteering secondary school girls champions in 2008.

History 
Havelock North High School opened in 1975. Like many New Zealand state secondary schools of the era, it was built to the "S68" standard plan, with single-storey classroom blocks of masonry construction, low-pitched roofs and internal open courtyards.

Houses
The Houses are named after trees found in New Zealand.
Tainui (yellow)
Kauri (blue)
Rata (red)
Miro (orange)

House activities 
Throughout the year, the four houses compete in a variety of sporting, cultural and academic events. Points are awarded both on individual success and collective house participation. The house with the most points is declared that year's winner, and a symbolic patu is presented to representatives of the winning house at the end of year prizegiving.

Each year the school picks a selection of 8 events. Athletics, Swimming Sports, Year 13 camp all are done while House Kapa Haka and Choir alternate every year. The final four are selection of past years and new ideas.

Some house events include: 
Swimming Sports
Athletic Sports
Year 13 camp
House Quiz
House Cross Country
House Orienteering
House Theater Sports
House Choir
House Kapa haka
Army Challenge

The introduction of several new events over recent years, (such as house quiz), are an attempt to expand house competition to beyond the traditional confines of sporting activities.

Notable alumni
Lynda Chanwai-Earle (living), writer
Jarrod Cunningham (1968–2007), rugby player
Alby Mathewson (born 1985), rugby player
Connan Mockasin (born 1982/1983), musician, composer and record producer
Greg Murphy (born 1972), V8 supercar driver
Geoff Sewell (born 1972), opera singer
Antonio Te Maioha (born 1970), television and film actor
William Trubridge (born 1980), world champion and world record holding freediver
Benson Wilson (living), opera singer

References

Secondary schools in the Hawke's Bay Region
Schools in Hastings, New Zealand
Educational institutions established in 1975
New Zealand secondary schools of S68 plan construction
1975 establishments in New Zealand